Leninkent (Dargwa: Шамшагар) is a rural locality (a selo) in Gubdensky Selsoviet, Karabudakhkentsky District, Republic of Dagestan, Russia. The population was 1,101 as of 2010. There are 6 streets.

Geography 
Leninkent is located 51 km northwest of Karabudakhkent (the district's administrative centre) by road. Makhachkala and Tyube are the nearest rural localities.

Nationalities 
Dargins live there.

References 

Rural localities in Karabudakhkentsky District